Fernando Gaspar (born 10 March 1966) is a Portuguese visual artist.

A self-taught visual artist, Gaspar started his career through the practice of drawing and watercolor. Entirely devoted to the activity since 1986, the year he first participated in exhibitions and awards, he regularly exhibits in the major cities of Portugal, exploring and adopting other media, materials and techniques.

Gaspar's first solo exhibition outside Portugal was in 1995 in Belgium. He has gathered a few national awards, participated in more than 40 group exhibitions in Europe, Asia, and South America, and held over 45 solo exhibitions in Portugal and other European countries. Throughout the past 27 years, the character of his work has evolved towards an increasingly reflective and contemporary approach.

Bibliography / Catalogs
Porto 1990 /1997. Aveiro - Portugal: Fernando Gaspar, 1997.
Bestiário - Touros. Aveiro - Portugal: Enquadrar, 1999.
Parcours Imaginaire. Brussels- Belgium: Nato, 2000.
Sítios da Memória. Braga - Portugal: Galeria dos Coimbras, 2000.
Lugares de uma Viagem. Lisbon - Portugal: Galeria de Arte do Casino Estoril, 2001.
No Limite da Água. Setubal - Portugal: Arte e Oficina, 2001.
Personagens para uma História. Lisbon- Portugal: Artemporio, 2002.
Bestiário - Insectos. Aveiro - Portugal: Enquadrar, 2002.
Rebelião no Zoo parte I. Lisbon - Portugal: Galeria de Arte do Casino Estoril, 2003.
Crónicas de um Encontro. Lisbon- Portugal: Galeria de Arte do Casino Estoril, 2005.
Atlânticas. Aveiro - Portugal: Espaço de Arte do Vera Cruz, 2005.
Ibéria. Lisboa - Portugal: Galeria de Arte do Casino Estoril, 2006.
El Afecto el Tiempo y el Río. Salamanca - Spain: Caja Duero / Fundación Duero, 2007.
Rebelião no Zoo parte II. Lisbon- Portugal: Galeria de Arte do Casino Estoril, 2010.
Ad Infinitum. Paris - França : FGAC, 2010.
Sexto Sentido. Macau - RPC : Galeria 57 - Arte Contemporânea, 2012. .
Remind 25. Aveiro - Portugal : Banister, 2012.  .

External links
Site Fernando Gaspar - Arte Contemporênea

References

1966 births
Living people